Glutathione hydrolase (glutathionase, GGT, gamma-glutamyltranspeptidase) is an enzyme. This enzyme catalyses the following chemical reaction

 glutathione + H2O  L-cysteinylglycine + L-glutamate

This protein also acts as enzyme EC 2.3.2.2 (gamma-glutamyltransferase).

References

External links 
 

EC 3.4.19